Sirajul Islam (15 May 1938 – 24 March 2015) was a Bangladeshi actor. He won the Bangladesh National Film Award for Best Supporting Actor in 1984 for his performance in "Chandranath".

Career
Along with his parents, Islam migrated to Dhaka in 1947.

Islam made his directorial debut in 1980 with the film Shonar Horin.

Personal life
Islam was married to Marufa Islam. Together they had three children including Mobassherul Islam.

References

External links
 

1938 births
2015 deaths
Bangladeshi male film actors
Burials at Banani Graveyard
Best Supporting Actor National Film Award (Bangladesh) winners